The 2009 Malaysia Super Series, not to be confused with the  2009 Malaysia Open Grand Prix Gold, was a badminton tournament held from January 6 to January 11, 2009 in Putra Indoor Stadium, Malaysia.

Winners

External links
Offizielle Website 
tournamentsoftware.com

Malaysia Open (badminton)
Sport in Kuala Lumpur
2009 in Malaysian sport
Malaysia